Han Yong-thae (born 30 October 1996) is a professional footballer who plays as a forward for Iwate Grulla Morioka on J2 League. Born in Japan, he has represented North Korea at youth level.

References

External links

Han Yong-thae at grulla-morioka.jp

1996 births
Living people
North Korean footballers
Japanese footballers
Association football forwards
Iwate Grulla Morioka players
Matsumoto Yamaga FC players
Kagoshima United FC players
Tochigi SC players
J2 League players